Dillinger is a 1991 television film directed by Rupert Wainwright and starring Mark Harmon as John Dillinger. It was first broadcast as The ABC Sunday Night Movie for January 6, 1991.

Plot
The film is based on the actual events of the pursuit of American bank robber John Dillinger during the 1930s.

Reception
Variety gave the film a mixed review, complimenting the direction and this historical look while taking note of factual errors and questioning the somewhat positive portrayal of Dillinger.

The Chicago Tribune praised Mark Harmon's "steamy portrayal", but also took note of factual inaccuracies and particularly disliked the fact that the movie was shot in Milwaukee, standing in for Chicago, even though historical locations such as the Biograph Theater were still available in Chicago.

Entertainment Weekly strongly disliked the film, giving it a "D" grade and criticizing it as "slow and aimless" and Harmon as "the stiffest sexiest-man-alive imaginable."

Cast

References

External links

1991 television films
1991 films
American television films
Films about John Dillinger
Films set in the 1930s
The Wolper Organization films
ABC Motion Pictures films
Films directed by Rupert Wainwright